Bilaspur State was a state of India from 1950 to 1954 with Bilaspur town as its capital. The state was established after the province of the same name created in 1948 from the princely state of Bilaspur.

The 31st state of Bilaspur, which had been until then a separate entity under the control of the Chief Commissioner, was integrated with Himachal Pradesh on 1 July 1954 thereby adding one more district to the state.

History

Bilaspur State was formed out of the territory of former Princely State of Bilaspur, which became part of the Dominion of India on 12 October 1948 by the accession of its erstwhile Ruler, Raja Anand Chand of the Princely State of Kahlur a.k.a. Bilaspur.

Bilaspur was a Province, until it was established as a Class "C" State, named Bilaspur State on 26 January 1950 within the Republic of India. Class "C" States were under the direct rule of the Central Government.

Disestablishment

After 'The Himachal Pradesh and Bilaspur (New State) Act, 1954' was passed by an act of Parliament Bilaspur State was dissolved on 1 July 1954 and incorporated into the State of Himachal Pradesh as Bilaspur district, with an area of 106,848 hectares.

Himachal Pradesh State was another part-C state under a Lt. Governor. Initially it had a 36-member Legislative Assembly and the first elections to the Assembly had been held in 1952. In 1954, when Bilaspur was merged with Himachal Pradesh, the strength of its Assembly was raised to 41.

Commissioners of Bilaspur State
 Raja Anand Chand from October 1948 to April 1949.
 Shrichand Chhabra, from April 1949 to November 1953
 M.S. Himmatsinhji, from November 1953 to July 1954

Chief Minister

 Anand Chand - 1948 - 1950
 K.S. Himmatsinhji - 1950 - 1952

See also

 Political integration of India
 States Reorganisation Act

References

History of Himachal Pradesh (1947–present)
1950 establishments in India
Political integration of India
1954 disestablishments in India
1948 establishments in India
Former states and territories of India